Luv' Gold is a 1993 greatest hits album by Dutch girl group Luv' which features hit singles like "You're the Greatest Lover", "Trojan Horse", "Casanova, "Ooh, Yes I Do" and some album tracks from the formation's heyday (1977 –  1981).

This compilation peaked at #14 in the Netherlands and spent 18 weeks on the album 
charts. Luv' hadn't scored a hit album for nearly thirteen years.

Luv' Gold includes a bonus track, "Megamix '93", issued as a single, which reached the 23rd position on the Dutch Top 40.

Album history
The release of this compilation was the idea of record producer Will Hoebee, José Hoebee's husband, who was inspired by the success of the Abba's and Boney M.'s Gold CDs and the 1970s pop/disco nostalgia. It was also the opportunity for the original Luv' members to reunite.

Patty Brard, José Hoebee and Marga Scheide had tried in early 1989 to record a comeback CD but they didn't succeed at this time. Marga was the only original singer of the group to carry on with other vocalists. She only scored with the renewed version of the trio a moderate hit single, "Welcome to My Party", in Benelux.

The promotion campaign of the Gold CD started in a notorious Amsterdam gay club (De iT) where the singers appeared in concert. The girl trio later performed on TV (including De Staatsloterijshow on RTL 4 and a TV Special aired on Veronica and filmed in the British Virgin Islands). Luv' also toured the club circuit in the Netherlands, Belgium, Germany and Denmark. Less than one year later, the pop act disbanded and reunited again in 2005.

Although Luv's previous album to reach the hit lists, Forever Yours (1980), was released more than twelve years prior, Luv' Gold entered the album charts within eighteen weeks. This album is the first exhaustive singles collection of the trio as it includes hit singles from their entire heyday in the late 1970s and early 1980s. It features songs from their Philips/Phonogram years (1977–1979) and their CNR/Carrere era (1979–1981).

Track listing
All tracks written by Hans van Hemert and Piet Souer under the pseudonym 'Janschen & Janschens'.

 "You're the Greatest Lover" – 2:51
 Taken from the album With Luv' (1978)
 "U.O.me (Waldolala)" – 2:58
 Taken from the album With Luv' (1978)
 Trojan Horse – 3:25
 Taken from the album With Luv' (1978)
 "My Man – 3:05
 Taken from the album With Luv' (1978)
 "Eeny Meeny Miny Moe – 2:59
 Taken from the album Lots of Luv' (1979a)
 "Ooh, Yes I Do" – 2:58
 Taken from the album True Luv' (1979b)
 "I Like Sugar Candy Kisses" – 3:36
 Taken from the album Lots of Luv' (1979a)
 "Dream, Dream" – 3:30
 Taken from the album With Luv' (1978)
 "One More Little Kissie" – 3:46
 Taken from the album Forever Yours (1980)
 "Life Is on My Side" – 2:38
 B-side of "Trojan Horse", taken from the album With Luv' (1978)
 "Ann-Maria – 4:41
 Taken from the album True Luv' (1979b)
 "Casanova – 3:51
 Taken from the album Lots of Luv' (1979a)
 "I.M.U.R" – 3:36
 B-side of "Eeny Meeny Miny Moe", taken from the album Lots of Luv' (1979a)
 "Tingalingaling – 2:31
 Taken from the album Forever Yours (1980)
 "Boys Goodnight" – 2:39
 Taken from the album True Luv' (1979b)
 "Getaway" – 3:04
 Taken from the album True Luv' (1979b)
 "Shoes off (Boots on)" – 3:07
 Taken from the album Lots of Luv' (1979a)
 My Number One – 3:11
 Taken from the album Forever Yours (1980)
 Who Do You Wanna Be – 3:42
 Taken from the album With Luv' (1978)
 Megamix '93 – 2:49
 Radio version. ("U.O.me (Waldolala)"/"Trojan Horse"/"You're The Greatest Lover"/"Ooh, Yes I Do")

Personnel
 José Hoebee – vocals
 Patty Brard – vocals
 Marga Scheide – vocals
 Ria Thielsch – vocals

Production
 Hans van Hemert – producer, songwriter (tracks 1-19)
 Martin Boer & Dick Liefting for Dancability Productions – track 20

Single release

Charts

References

External links
 Detailed Luv' discography at Rate Your Music
 Detailed Luv' discography at Discogs
 Details about Luv' Gold (1993)
 Interview of Dennis Erhardt, the A&R manager of Arcade Records who supervised the 1993 Luv' comeback and the promotion of Luv' Gold (1993)
 Article about the 15th Anniversary of Luv' Gold (1993)

Luv' albums
1993 greatest hits albums